Nine ships of the Royal Navy have been named HMS Glasgow after the Scottish city of Glasgow:

The first  was a 20-gun sixth rate, previously the Scottish ship Royal Mary. She was transferred to the Royal Navy in 1707 and was sold in 1719.
The second  was a 24-gun sixth rate launched in 1745 and sold in 1756.
The third  was a 20-gun sixth rate launched in 1757 and accidentally burnt in 1779.
The fourth  was a 40-gun fifth-rate  launched in 1814 and broken up by 1829.
The fifth  was a wooden screw frigate launched in 1861 and sold in 1884.
The sixth  was a  light cruiser launched in 1909 and sold in 1927.
The seventh  was a  light cruiser launched in 1936 and scrapped in 1958.
The eighth  was a Type 42 destroyer launched in 1976. She was decommissioned in 2005 and scrapped in 2009.
The ninth  is currently under construction and will be the lead ship of the Royal Navy's Type 26 frigates.

Battle honours
Lagos 1759
Havana 1762
Algiers 1816
Navarino 1827
Coronel 1914
Falkland Islands 1914
Norway 1940
Arctic 1943
Biscay 1943
Normandy 1944
Falkland Islands 1982

See also
  was the royal yacht of the Sultan of Zanzibar, built in 1873 in the style of the 1861 HMS Glasgow and sunk in 1896

References

Royal Navy ship names